The Piabanha River is a river of Rio de Janeiro state in southeastern Brazil.
It is a tributary of the Paraíba do Sul.

Basin

The basin of the Piabanha River includes the basins of the upper Piabanha, Preto, Fagundes and Paquequer rivers.
It fully drains the municipalities of Teresópolis, Carmo, Sapucaia, Sumidouro, Areal and São José do Vale do Rio Preto, and partially drains the municipalities of Petrópolis, Paty do Alferes, Paraíba do Sul, Duas Barras and Três Rios.
The headwaters of the river are protected by the Três Picos State Park, Serra dos Órgãos National Park, Petrópolis Municipal Nature Park, Montanhas de Teresópolis Municipal Nature Park, Araras State Biological Reserve and Araponga Municipal Nature Park among others.

Course

The Preto drains the municipalities of Teresópolis and São José do Vale do Rio Preto, and joins the Piabanha in Areal.
The Piabanha also receives the Fagundes in Areal.

See also
List of rivers of Rio de Janeiro

References

Sources

Rivers of Rio de Janeiro (state)